"Everything's Ruined" is a song from American rock band Faith No More's fourth studio album, Angel Dust (1992), and the final single to be released from the album's original track listing. The single was released on November 9, 1992, and charted at number 28 in the United Kingdom.

Music video
The music video, directed by Kevin Kerslake, features the band (and occasionally three children) singing, blue screened over stock footage ranging from wildlife shots, baseball games and a wide selection of other clips. The band at times interacts with the clips, like fleeing from a seemingly-giant tortoise.

Billy Gould addressed the intentional cheapness of the video in a 20th anniversary Q&A on the Faith No More Blog:
Why was it that the video for "Everything's Ruined" (arguably the best song on the album) was so goofy and easy to produce?

The easy answer is, Warner's spent the video budget on "Small V" and "Midlife" so that when it came time to "Everything's Ruined" there's wasn't much left (!!). It was our idea to take this further and make a video as cheap as humanly possible, in one of those video booths like they had at county fairs, where you sing and dance in front of a blue screen. We didn't quite get to do that, but we got it as close as possible.

Accolades
The information regarding accolades acquired from AcclaimedMusic.net

Track listings
UK Part 1
 "Everything's Ruined"
 "Edge of the World (Extended Live Mix with Bass Solo)" (St. Louis, September 18, 1992)
 "RV" (Live in Dekalb, Illinois, September 20, 1992)

UK Part 2
 "Everything's Ruined"
 "Midlife Crisis" (live in Dekalb, Illinois, September 20, 1992)
 "Land of Sunshine" (live in Dekalb, Illinois, September 20, 1992)

Europe
 "Everything's Ruined"
 "Easy" (live from Munich, November 9, 1992)
 "RV" (live in Dekalb, Illinois, September 20, 1992)

Charts

Footnotes

Faith No More songs
1992 singles
1992 songs
Music videos directed by Kevin Kerslake
Songs written by Billy Gould
Songs written by Jim Martin (musician)
Songs written by Mike Patton
Songs written by Roddy Bottum